Saga of Tanya the Evil: The Movie (劇場版 幼女戦記 Gekijōban Yōjo Senki) is a 2019 Japanese animated fantasy action film based on The Saga of Tanya the Evil light novel series, intended as a sequel to the anime series that aired in 2017. It was released in Japan on February 8, 2019. The cast and staff reprised their roles from the anime TV series.

Plot
Years after the war, Adelheid von Schugel, now a priest, explains to a reporter that the Empire was at war because all the other nations feared its power.

The 203rd Aerial Mage Battalion are on a sortie in Africa against Free Republic forces and destroy their headquarters. Tanya announces triumphantly that the 203rd would return to the Empire for R&R, but upon their return, Rerugen orders them into an immediate reconnaissance mission on the Empire's eastern border with the Russy Federation. At the border, while the 203rd observe Federation forces stockpiling heavy artillery materiel they receive a message advising that the Federation has declared war on the Empire. Tanya and the 203rd proceeds to destroy the entire enemy encampment. She proposes a direct attack on the Moscow, the capital city of the Federation, asserting that its AA defence is so poor that a Cessna could land in Red Square unmolested. HQ authorizes the attack, and the 203rd are unopposed in the air because the Federation has sent its mages to internment camps.

Meanwhile, Warrant Officer Mary Sioux, has enlisted in the US Army to avenge her father, Anton Sioux. She arrives in Moscow with other multinational military volunteers of the 42nd Flying Division for recruit training under the commanding officer Lieutenant Colonel William Drake but the 42nd suffers casualties as a result of Tanya's attack. The 203rd use the successful operation as an opportunity to record propaganda footage by singing the Imperial national anthem over Moscow. Loria, a pedophiliac member of the Federation's cabinet witnesses Tanya singing and becomes infatuated with her.

Mary however becomes enraged and disobeys Drake's orders, taking off alone to engage the 203rd. The remaining members of the 42nd are also forced engage in battle where they suffer losses because of their inexperience. Mary engages Tanya in a fierce duel, but is defeated and is found later lying gravely wounded in a crater begging God for the power to kill Tanya.

The 203rd and other Imperial soldiers celebrate their successes at Imperial East Border Temporary Camp 21, drinking the night away. The 203rd receives a request to assist the 3rd and 22nd Divisions, who have been encircled at Tiegenhoff. Tanya agrees to help, because taking control of Tiegenhoff would give the Empire control of the major railway hub leading into the Federation. The 203rd succeeds in defending Tiegenhoff, much to the delight of the besieged soldiers. Back in Moscow, Loria suspects Tanya is at Tiegenhoff and advocates the use of a massed assault to capture the city.

The Federation begins a human wave attack on Tiegenhoff, causing massive casualties on both sides. The fight continues into the next day, with the arrival of the 42nd and a bomber flight, escorted by fighters. Mary sees Tanya and in a rage, disobeys Drake's orders by attacking Tanya alone, exhibiting her abnormally massive magical power. While dueling, Tanya suspects that Mary has been influenced by Being X. Mary incapacitates Tanya and violently assaults her on the ground. Tanya manages to grievously wound Mary but she is rescued by Drake. With the Federation assault halted, Drake orders the 42nd to retreat. Tanya realizes that her envisioned "peaceful life" is unlikely to materialize due to Being X's meddling.

Tanya convinces Strategic Headquarters to let her transfer to the rear for two months to do research on combined arms battle tactics. She visits a church and expresses elation at having been removed from the frontline while insulting Being X. To her horror, two months later Tanya is informed by Zettour that she will be been given control of the 8th Kampfgruppe 'Salamander': a combined arms unit comprising artillery, infantry, tanks in addition to her own 203rd in order to investigate the efficacy of her own research.

Cast

Reception
The film was both a critical and commercial success, earning 100 million yen in its first five days and 400 million yen in total.

Overall, the film received generally positive reviews. Dave Trumbore of Collider favourably reviewed the film, giving it an 'A−'. Trumbore wrote, "The war acts as a backdrop for these two incredibly powerful mages who wind up on a destined collision course with each other, and it’s a fight you won’t want to miss." Jordan Ramée of GameSpot rated it 7/10, and praised the introduction of Mary Sioux as a character, writing, "Mary [Sioux] injects a welcome level of tension into the story, and is a compelling villain for Tanya to fight," but also notes that "Other than the final fight, battles lack the intensity of an aerial dogfight".

Notes

References

2019 fantasy films
2010s war films
2019 anime films
2019 films
Animated war films
Anime films based on light novels
Fantasy war films
Japanese animated fantasy films
Supernatural war films
Japanese supernatural films
NUT (studio)